Criminal Court is a 1946 American crime drama directed by Robert Wise. It stars Tom Conway and Martha O'Driscoll.

Plot
Hotshot lawyer Steve Barnes is a candidate to be district attorney. His girlfriend Georgia Gale has a job singing for nightclub owner Vic Wright, a gangster who works for the mob boss, Marquette.

Steve has film footage of Vic and brother Frankie committing crimes. He rejects a $50,000 bribe made in the form of a campaign donation. Joan, his secretary, spies on Steve for the gangster. She witnesses a struggle for a gun and sees Vic accidentally shot dead.

Georgia is seen leaving the scene and is charged with murder. Marquette will have his stooge Joe West give false testimony to convict her unless Steve plays ball.

Steve realizes just in time that Joan is involved and calls her to the stand. West tries to shoot her, but is overcome. Joan tells what really happened and Georgia goes free.

Cast
 Tom Conway as Steve Barnes
 Martha O'Driscoll as Georgia Gale
 June Clayworth as Joan Mason
 Robert Armstrong as Vic Wright
 Addison Richards as District Attorney Gordon

References

External links
 
 
 
 

1945 films
Films directed by Robert Wise
RKO Pictures films
American crime drama films
1940s crime drama films
American black-and-white films
1945 drama films
1946 drama films
1946 films
Films scored by Paul Sawtell
1940s English-language films
1940s American films